St. Teresa's Catholic Church is a historic church at 211 E. 5th Avenue in Hutchinson, Kansas, United States.  It was built in 1910 and added to the National Register on April 29, 1994.

The church is part of the St. Teresa of Avila Parish

History
The Reverend Farrell became pastor of the church 1908 when it was still a small frame building.  In September 1909, a collection was held to raise funds for a new building.  The cornerstone of the new Romanesque building was laid in May 1910.  The building was completed and dedicated on May 18, 1911.

References

Buildings and structures in Reno County, Kansas
Churches on the National Register of Historic Places in Kansas
Roman Catholic churches completed in 1910
Churches in the Roman Catholic Diocese of Wichita
Romanesque Revival church buildings in Kansas
National Register of Historic Places in Reno County, Kansas
20th-century Roman Catholic church buildings in the United States